Vägen till Gyllenblå! (English: The Road to Golden Blue) is a Swedish science fiction TV miniseries that premiered on 29 December 1985.

Plot summary 
Two children are set to bring back laughter to the planet Gyllenblå.

Cast list 
 Maria Tornlund as Cecilie
 Erik Lindgren as Fredrik
 Liv Alsterlund as Galaxia
 Sven-Erik Vikström as Ratio Rasch
 Kim Anderzon as Kubina
 Christina Carlwind as Jörgensen / Supernova
 Maria Hedborg as Karin / Epicykel
 Tuncel Kurtiz as Dr. Krull
 Peder Falk as Foton
 Lennart Tollén as Eon
 Benny Haag as Meteor

References

External links 
 

1985 Swedish television series debuts
Swedish science fiction television series
1980s Swedish television series
Swedish children's television series